Aleksandr Zaikin may refer to:

 Aleksandr Vladimirovich Zaikin (b. 1988), Russian footballer
 Aleksandr Yevgenyevich Zaikin (b. 1974), Russian footballer